Marcus Holm (born 5 December 1973) is a Swedish ice sledge hockey player. He plays for HIF Kämparna, and is paraplegic.

He represented Sweden at the 2010 Winter Paralympics in Vancouver. This was his fifth Winter Paralympics; he also took part in 1998 and 2002, where Sweden took bronze both times, and at the 2006 Winter Paralympics.

He also has two World Championships medals; bronze from the 2000 IPC Ice Sledge Hockey World Championships and 2004 IPC Ice Sledge Hockey World Championships.

Before he became a sledge hockey player he was a crosscountry skier, and took part in the Winter Paralympics in Lillehammer 1994.

External links
Profile at Svenska Handikappidrottsförbundet
Profile at Vancouver 2010

1973 births
Living people
2010 Winter Paralympians of Sweden
Ice sledge hockey players at the 2010 Winter Paralympics
2006 Winter Paralympians of Sweden
Ice sledge hockey players at the 2006 Winter Paralympics
2002 Winter Paralympians of Sweden
Ice sledge hockey players at the 2002 Winter Paralympics
1998 Winter Paralympians of Sweden
Ice sledge hockey players at the 1998 Winter Paralympics
2014 Winter Paralympians of Sweden
Ice sledge hockey players at the 2014 Winter Paralympics
2018 Winter Paralympians of Sweden
Para ice hockey players at the 2018 Winter Paralympics
Medalists at the 1998 Winter Paralympics
Paralympic sledge hockey players of Sweden
Swedish sledge hockey players
Paralympic medalists in sledge hockey
Paralympic bronze medalists for Sweden
20th-century Swedish people
21st-century Swedish people